Romano is a railway station serving the town of Romano di Lombardia, in the region of Lombardy, northern Italy. The station is located on the Milan–Venice railway. The train services are operated by  Trenord.

History
Between 1888 and 1931 the station was at a stop on the Bergamo to Soncino tramway.

Train services
The station is served by the following service(s):

Express services (Treno regionale) Milan - Treviglio - Brescia - Verona
Regional services (Treno regionale) Sesto San Giovanni - Milan - Treviglio - Brescia

See also

History of rail transport in Italy
List of railway stations in Lombardy
Rail transport in Italy
Railway stations in Italy

References

 This article is based upon a translation of the Italian language version as of January 2016.

External links

Railway stations in Lombardy